Anna Maria Agnes "Agnes" van Ardenne-Van der Hoeven (born 21 January 1950) is a retired Dutch politician and diplomat of the Christian Democratic Appeal (CDA).

Career
Agnes van Ardenne was born in Maasland in 1950. Before taking office as a member of the Cabinet of the Netherlands, Van Ardenne was the Deputy Chairwoman of the Netherlands-based Catholic Organisation for Relief and Development Aid (CORDAID) and Secretary General of the UNICEF National Committee of the Netherlands.

As member of the House of Representatives between 1994 and 2002, van Ardenne was a member of the parliament's delegations to the Parliamentary Assembly of the Council of Europe (PACE).

Between 2002 and 2007, van Ardenne served as Minister for Development Cooperation in the cabinet of Prime Minister Jan Peter Balkenende. When the Netherlands held the presidency of the Council of the European Union in 2004, she chaired the meetings of the EU Development Ministers.

During her time in office, van Ardenne focused on fragile states and countries in conflict, including Sudan. She chose to concentrate Dutch bilateral development cooperation on Africa (at least 50% of the bilateral budget). In 2006, she ordered a suspension of nearly $150 million in aid to the government of President Mwai Kibaki of Kenya because of concerns over corruption.

Van Ardenne was one of the first foreign dignitaries to visit Pakistan after the 2005 Kashmir earthquake, to witness the emergency aid operation still being conducted at full capacity.

In 2006, van Ardenne increased the Netherlands’ support to post-primary and higher education to 110 million euros per year from the earlier level of 60 million euros, and increased its contribution to the Education for All Fast Track Initiative (FTI) to 150 million euros in 2006 and subsequent years.

Also in 2006, van Ardenne significantly increased the Dutch contribution to the Global Alliance for Vaccines and Immunization (GAVI), pledging nearly €100 million over four years for global vaccination and programmes to strengthen health systems. In what was the single largest earmarked donation UNICEF had received in its then 60-year history, van Ardenne later pledged $201 million over four years to expand the agency's ongoing efforts to ensure that children in conflict, natural disasters and emerging from crisis can go to school.

After leaving office, van Ardenne worked as her country’s Permanent Representative to the Food and Agriculture Organization (FAO), the World Food Program (WFP) and the International Fund for Agricultural Development (IFAD) in Rome from 2007 until 2011. She was succeeded by Gerda Verburg.

Between 2011 and 2014, van Ardenne served as chairwoman of the Dutch Product Board for Horticulture. Since 2017, she has been chairwoman of the Netherlands Inspection Service for Horticulture.

Other activities

International organizations
 African Development Bank (AfDB), Ex-Officio Alternate Member of the Board of Governors (2003-2007)
 Asian Development Bank (ADB), Ex-Officio Alternate Member of the Board of Governors (2003-2007)
 World Bank, Ex-Officio Alternate Member of the Board of Governors (2003-2007)

Non-profit organizations
 African Studies Centre (ASC) at Leiden University, Chairwoman of the Board of Governors (since 2013)
 Council for the Environment and Infrastructure (RLI), Member (since 2012)
 Van Hall Larenstein, President of the Supervisory Board
 Marga Klompé Foundation, Chairwoman of the Board

Political positions
On 30 March 2012, van Ardenne and several other prominent CDA members, including former Prime Ministers Ruud Lubbers and Piet de Jong, signed a petition of disapproval on the proposed cuts to the budget of international development by the first cabinet of Prime Minister Mark Rutte.

Decorations

References

External links

Official
  A.M.A. (Agnes) van Ardenne-van der Hoeven, Parlememt.com

 

 

 
 

1950 births
Living people
Christian Democratic Appeal politicians
Dutch nonprofit directors
Dutch nonprofit executives
Dutch officials of the United Nations
Dutch Roman Catholics
Dutch women diplomats
Mayors in South Holland
People from Westland (municipality), Netherlands
International Fund for Agricultural Development people
Members of the House of Representatives (Netherlands)
Ministers for Development Cooperation of the Netherlands
Municipal councillors in South Holland
People from Vlaardingen
Officers of the Order of Orange-Nassau
People from Maassluis
People from Midden-Delfland
Representatives of the Netherlands to the Food and Agriculture Organization
State Secretaries for Foreign Affairs of the Netherlands
Women government ministers of the Netherlands
Women mayors of places in the Netherlands
World Food Programme people
20th-century Dutch civil servants
20th-century Dutch diplomats
20th-century Dutch women politicians
20th-century Dutch politicians
21st-century Dutch civil servants
21st-century Dutch diplomats
21st-century Dutch women politicians
21st-century Dutch politicians
Dutch women ambassadors